Jaana Laitinen-Pesola (born 6 September 1958) is a Finnish politician and a member of the Finnish Parliament, representing the National Coalition Party. Laitinen-Pesola was born in Pori, and was elected to the parliament in 2015, gaining 3,483 votes in the elections. She was the chairman of Tehy 1997–2013.

References

1958 births
Living people
People from Pori
National Coalition Party politicians
Members of the Parliament of Finland (2015–19)